The Marmara blackout of 2012 is a widespread power outage that began at 13:43 local time (EET, UTC+2), 14 January to 27 April 2012 throughout parts of the Marmara Region of Turkey.

The affected area includes parts of Istanbul, the most densely populated city, and Kocaeli where the vast majority of the country's industry is located. The blackout knocked out metro and tram operation in Istanbul, 104 days fully restored.

References 

2012 industrial disasters
Power outages
January 2012 events in Turkey
2012 in Turkey
2012 disasters in Turkey